The frosted myotis (クロホオヒゲコウモリ in Japanese) (Myotis pruinosus) is a species of vesper bat. It is found only in Japan.

Taxonomy
It was first discovered in August 1969 by Kimio Endo. In 1971, it was described by Mizuko Yoshiyuki.
It is most closely related to the Yanbaru whiskered bat and the Burmese whiskered bat. Based on its similarity to these two species, it is hypothesized that the ancestor of the frosted myotis evolved to the south of Japan, and its range expanded northwards over time.

Description
It is a small species of bat.
The fur of its back is brackish brown, with conspicuous frosted tips.
The fur of its belly is lighter in color than the dorsal surface.
Its wing membranes are dark brown.
Their ears are narrow and short, with the tragus about half as high as the ear.

Biology
It roosts in tree hollows during the day.
It is therefore dependent on large trees with hollows, and is not found in habitats where they aren't any.
It is a diploid species, with two copies each of 22 chromosomes, for a total of 44 chromosomes.

Range and habitat
It is found most often in mountain forests of lower elevations.
It has been recorded in the Honshu, Shikoku, and Kyushu islands of Japan.

Conservation
It is currently evaluated as endangered by the IUCN.
It is believed that its population size is declining.
Some of the main threats facing this species are habitat destruction and forest fragmentation.

References

Mouse-eared bats
Bats of Asia
Mammals described in 1971
Taxonomy articles created by Polbot